Iodobenzoic acid may refer to:

 2-Iodobenzoic acid
 3-Iodobenzoic acid
 4-Iodobenzoic acid